Ivan Orlinov Yordanov (born 7 November 2000) is a Bulgarian footballer who plays as a midfielder for Spartak Varna on loan from Ludogorets Razgrad.

Career
Yordanov joined Ludogorets academy in 2017 from Botev 2002. He made his senior debut with the reserves in the Bulgarian Second League on 13 May 2018, playing full 90 minutes in a 4–0 away loss against Montana. On 1 October 2018, Yordanov scored his first goal for Ludogorets II in a 2–2 home draw against Pomorie. In December 2018, he signed a professional contract with the club.

Yordanov made his first team debut on 13 July 2019, coming on as a second-half substitute for Dominik Yankov in a 2–0 home league win over Tsarsko Selo.

In June 2021, Yordanov was fully promoted to the first team by the first team manager, Valdas Dambrauskas.

In January 2023 Yordanov was sent on loan to Spartak Varna until the end of the season. He made his league debut on 20 February in a match against Hebar Pazardzhik. A week later he scored his first goal for the team in a league win against Botev Vratsa becoming also the man of the match.

International career
On 5 September 2022, Yordanov received his first call-up for the Bulgaria national team for the UEFA Nations League games against Gibraltar and North Macedonia on 23 and 26 September 2022. He made his debut for the team on 26 September, coming as a substitute in the match against North Macedonia, won by Bulgaria by 0-1.

Career statistics

Club

References

External links
 

2000 births
Living people
Bulgarian footballers
Bulgaria youth international footballers
Bulgaria international footballers
PFC Ludogorets Razgrad II players
PFC Ludogorets Razgrad players
PFC Spartak Varna players
First Professional Football League (Bulgaria) players
Second Professional Football League (Bulgaria) players
Association football midfielders
People from Rakovski